1330 Spiridonia, provisional designation , is a dark background asteroid of primitive composition, located in the outer regions of the asteroid belt, approximately 65 kilometers in diameter. It was discovered on 17 February 1925, by Soviet astronomer Vladimir Albitsky at the Simeiz Observatory on the Crimean peninsula. The asteroid was named after the discoverer's brother-in-law, Spiridon Zaslavskij.

Orbit and classification 

Spiridonia is a non-family asteroid from the main belt's background population. It orbits the Sun in the outer asteroid belt at a distance of 2.9–3.4 AU once every 5 years and 8 months (2,061 days; semi-major axis of 3.17 AU). Its orbit has an eccentricity of 0.08 and an inclination of 16° with respect to the ecliptic.

The body's observation arc begins at Yerkes Observatory in October 1934, more than 9 years after its official discovery observation at Simeiz.

Physical characteristics 

In the Tholen classification, Spiridonia is a primitive P-type asteroid.

Rotation period 

Several rotational lightcurves of Spiridonia have been obtained from photometric observations since 2004. Analysis of the best-rated lightcurve by American photometrist Robert Stephens at the Santana Observatory  from April 2005, gave a rotation period of 9.67 hours with a brightness amplitude of 0.16 magnitude.

Diameter and albedo 

According to the surveys carried out by the Infrared Astronomical Satellite IRAS, the Japanese Akari satellite and the NEOWISE mission of NASA's Wide-field Infrared Survey Explorer, Spiridonia measures between 50.73 and 78.496 kilometers in diameter and its surface has an albedo between 0.029 and 0.06.

The Collaborative Asteroid Lightcurve Link derives an albedo of 0.0580 and a diameter of 55.17 kilometers based on an absolute magnitude of 10.0.

Naming 

This minor planet was named after the discoverer's brother-in-law, Spiridon Zaslavskij (1883–1942), who was also the uncle of Viktorovich Zaslavskij (1925–1944), after whom the discoverer named the asteroid 1030 Vitja. The official  was published by the Minor Planet Center on 15 July 1968.

References

External links 
 Asteroid Lightcurve Database (LCDB), query form (info )
 Dictionary of Minor Planet Names, Google books
 Asteroids and comets rotation curves, CdR – Observatoire de Genève, Raoul Behrend
 Discovery Circumstances: Numbered Minor Planets (1)-(5000) – Minor Planet Center
 
 

001330
Discoveries by Vladimir Albitsky
Named minor planets
001330
19250217